Biķernieki Complex Sports Base is a racing circuit and cross-country skiing course in  the Biķernieki Forest in Riga. Adjacent to the racing circuit is the Riga Speedway Stadium.

History
In 1962, the design of the track was started. Eduardu Kiopi was appointed director of the sports complex, and the project manager was Gunars Binde. A group of specialists were also invited: Peter Dzenis, Janis Roops, Karlis Rība and Vilnis Vasulis. During the first phase of the project, it was planned to create two circles which initially were to be used for motorcycle racing and kart racing.

In January 1966 the construction of the circuit began. The first difficulties appeared as there were swamps and underground springs at the start line for the karts, so in places, constructors had to dig up to seven metres deep and fill it with several tens of thousands of cubic metres of sand. Because of the difficulty of building the track, many local volunteers were involved in the project. In July of the same year, the first races were held there, with motorcycle races in six different classes taking place.

Fifty years later, a Rallycross circuit was created after Latvia won a contract to host a round of the FIA World Rallycross Championship. This circuit also hosts rounds of the FIA European Rallycross Championship and the FIA NEZ Rallycross Championship. The rallycross rounds were held until 2022, the circuit was dropped from the 2023 season.

In the  Ring of Skill layout, Andrejs Grīnbergs broke the lap record with a time of 1:38.480 in superbike.

Layouts

See also
 Rallycross
 FIA World Rallycross Championship
 FIA European Rallycross Championship

References

External links

 Official website

Motorsport venues
World Rallycross circuits
Sports venues in Latvia